This is a list of medalists at the Rhythmic Gymnastics World Championships. Bold numbers in brackets denotes record numbers of victories in corresponding disciplines.

Individual All-Around

Individual Freehands

Individual Apparatus

Rope

Hoop

Ball

Ribbon

Clubs

Teams

Group All-Around

Group Single Apparatus

Group Multiple Apparatus

Multiple gold medalists

Boldface denotes active rhythmic gymnasts and highest medal count among all rhythmic gymnasts (including these who not included in these tables) per type.

All events

Individual events

Records

References 

Rhythmic Gymnastics World Championships
Lists of medalists in gymnastics